Lucia Aliberti (born 12 June 1957) is a Sicilian operatic soprano singer. She performed the bel canto roles of Bellini, Rossini, Donizetti, Verdi, Puccini, Vivaldi, Mercadante and so on.

Life and career
Aliberti was born in Messina. She studied piano, composition, conducting, and singing at the Conservatory, where she graduated with a diploma with full marks very young. She then completed her studies in Rome with Maestro Luigi Ricci and continued the study with Alfredo Kraus. Musician and composer, while studying singing, she was also studying the piano and other musical instruments (guitar, accordion, violin, mandolin). She has composed many pieces for piano, clarinet, flute and singing.

She began her artistic career in Spoleto at the Festival dei Due Mondi, under the direction of Gian Carlo Menotti. A lyric-dramatic soprano with agility, Aliberti graduated very young at the conservatory with honors. She studied with Luigi Ricci in Rome, Alfredo Kraus and Herbert von Karajan in Salzburg and Berlin.

She has also studied the piano and other musical instruments like guitar, accordion, violin and mandolin. She has composed many pieces for piano, clarinet, flute, violin and voice. After winning the Spoleto and ENAL competitions, she began her artistic career with La sonnambula by Bellini in Spoleto at the Festival dei Due Mondi under the direction of Gian Carlo Menotti.

Operatic repertoire
She is considered a specialist in the repertory of Vincenzo Bellini (she has also dedicated intense study to some of his manuscripts). The other most important composer in her repertory are Donizetti, Rossini and Verdi. Several operas of these composers have become her most successful roles:

 Lucia di Lammermoor (Lucia)
 Anna Bolena (Anna)
 Lucrezia Borgia (Lucrezia)
 Beatrice di Tenda (Beatrice)
 Maria Stuarda (Maria)
 Norma (Norma)
 La sonnambula (Amina)
 I puritani (Elvira)
 Il pirata (Imogene)
 La straniera (Alaide)
 I Capuleti e i Montecchi (Giulietta)
 Semiramide (Semiramide)
 La traviata (Violetta)
 Simon Boccanegra (Maria)
 Luisa Miller (Luisa)
 Rigoletto (Gilda)

Honors and awards
Aliberti has received two prestigious European Prizes: The  in Hamburg, the Premio Callas from the Association of Opera Friends of Milan, Iso D'Oro in Graz, Austria.

Recordings

Complete operas
 Beatrice di Tenda (Beatrice), Martin Thompson (Orombello), Camille Capasso (Agnese), Paolo Gavenelli (Fillipo) – Chor und Orchester der Deutschen Oper Berlin – Fabio Luisi (conductor) – (Berlin Classics)
 Il pirata (Imogene), Stuart Neill, Roberto Frontali, Kelly Anderson – Chor und Orchester der Deutschen Oper Berlin – Marcello Viotti (conductor) – (Berlin Classics)
 La sonnambula (Amina), John Aler (Elvino), Francesco Ellero d'Artegna (Rodolfo), Iris Vermillion (Teresa), Jane Giering (Lisa), Friedrich Molsberger (Alessio), Warren Mok (Il Notario) – Chor und Orchester der Deutschen Oper Berlin – Jesús López Cobos (conductor), live recording, February 1990, Deutsche Oper Berlin (BMG Classics)
 La straniera (Alaide), Vincenzo Bello, Roberto Frontali, Sara Mingardo, Carlo Striuli – Orchestra del Teatro Verdi di Trieste – Gianfranco Masini (conductor) – (BMG Ricordi)
 La traviata (Violetta Valery), Peter Dvorský (Alfredo Germont), Renato Bruson (Giorgio Germont) – Fujiwara Opera Chorus and Tokyo Philharmonic Orchestra –  (conductor), live recording, Tokyo (Capriccio/Delta Music)

Recitals
 Famous Opera Arias – Münchner Rundfunkorchester – Lamberto Gardelli (conductor) – (Orfeo)
 A Portrait – Nordwestdeutsche Philharmonie – Peter Feranec (conductor) – (RCA/BMG Classics)
 Viva! Belcanto – Orchestra Sinfonica Di Milano G. Verdi – Patrick Fournillier (conductor) – (RCA/BMG Classics)
 Early Verdi Arias – Orchestra Sinfonica e Coro Sinfonico di Milano Giuseppe Verdi – Oleg Caetani (conductor) – (Challenge Records)

DVD
 Lucia Aliberti – Live at Semperoper Dresden – DVD 88697 19045 9 / RCA Red Seal – SonyBMG

References

External links

1957 births
Living people
Italian operatic sopranos
Musicians from Messina
20th-century Italian women opera singers
21st-century Italian women opera singers